MTN 8 is the current branding for a South African soccer cup competition launched in 1972 for teams who finished in the top 8 positions of the league table of the country's preceding top-flight league (currently the DStv Premiership) season.

The winners receive R 8 million and the competition's trophy, which is one of the three domestic trophies attainable by its competitors each soccer season, with the other two being the top-flight league title and the country's premier knock-out competition, the Nedbank Cup.

Like the EFL Cup in England, the competition name bears its title title sponsor; from its launch until 2002, it was known as the BP Top 8 and as the SAA Supa 8 until 2008.

Format
Since the competition features 8 teams, the first round, also known as the quarter finals, has the following format: 

The second round, or the semi-finals, are played over two legs.

Prize money
As of 2020, the prize money is as follows:

Winners
The previous winners of the competition are as follows:

As BP Top 8 (1972–2002)

 1972 : Orlando Pirates
 1973 : Orlando Pirates (2)
 1974 : Kaizer Chiefs
 1975 : Moroka Swallows
 1976 : Kaizer Chiefs (2)
 1977 : Kaizer Chiefs (3)
 1978 : Orlando Pirates (3)
 1979 : Moroka Swallows (2)
 1980 : Witbank Black Aces
 1981 : Kaizer Chiefs (4)
 1982 : Kaizer Chiefs (5)
 1983 : Orlando Pirates (4)
 1984 : Wits University
 1985 : Kaizer Chiefs (6)
 1986 : Arcadia Shepherds
 1987 : Kaizer Chiefs (7)
 1988 : Mamelodi Sundowns
 1989 : Kaizer Chiefs (8)
 1990 : Mamelodi Sundowns (2)
 1991 : Kaizer Chiefs (9)
 1992 : Kaizer Chiefs (10)
 1993 : Orlando Pirates (5)
 1994 : Kaizer Chiefs (11)
 1995 : Wits University (2)
 1996 : Orlando Pirates (6)
 2000 : Orlando Pirates (7)
 2001 : Kaizer Chiefs (12)
 2002 : Santos

As SAA Super 8 (2003–2007)

 2003 : Jomo Cosmos
 2004 : Supersport United
 2005 : Bloemfontein Celtic
 2006 : Kaizer Chiefs (13)
 2007 : Mamelodi Sundowns (3)

As MTN 8 (2008–present)

 2008 : Kaizer Chiefs (14)
 2009 : Golden Arrows
 2010 : Orlando Pirates (8)
 2011 : Orlando Pirates (9)
 2012 : Moroka Swallows (3)
 2013 : Platinum Stars
 2014 : Kaizer Chiefs (15)
 2015 : Ajax Cape Town
 2016 : Bidvest Wits (3)
 2017 : Supersport United (2)
 2018 : Cape Town City
 2019 : Supersport United (3)
 2020 : Orlando Pirates (10)
 2021 : Mamelodi Sundowns (4)
 2022 : Orlando Pirates (11)

Results by team

References

External links
Premier Soccer League official website
South African Football Association website

 
Soccer cup competitions in South Africa